Cytinus visseri, commonly known as the Northern vampire cup, is a holoparasitic flowering plant in the family Cytinaceae. This flower favorably interacts with another plant, Helichrysum reflexum, that is a woody shrub in South Africa.

Etymology
This flower was first discovered by Johann Visser but he was unable to name it himself due to his untimely passing. But after recognition of his discovery, the species was officially named after him by Prix Burgoyne.

Description

Distribution
Cytinus visseri is native to South Africa. 
This flower is seen in the areas of rocky outcrops in Long Tom Pass in Mpumalanga province, Limpopo province, and Eswatini.

Habitat and ecology

Cytinus visseri is an erect, perennial, and a dioecious species. It lacks a true root system but forms endophytic cells to attach to the host and burst out of the host's primordium bearing red flowers at its tip. They can grow up to 30-120mm high with seed size of 0.2 – 0.4 mm long.
The members of Cytinus are not host-specific parasites and are seen to favorably interact with members from the family Asteraceae. However the flower may interact with other woody shrub taxa. C. visseri often interacts with H. reflexum, a plant that belongs to Asteraceae.
When H. reflexum is infected, it is rarely seen that more than one C. visseri infects the same host plant. They are commonly located under the dense canopy of the host where it synchronizes with the host's flowering period.

Pollination and seed dispersal

The method of pollination is by using scent cue to lure mammalian ground-dwellers. Due to location, scent cues are more effective in manipulating behaviors in mammalian ground-dwellers. Mammals that assist in pollination are the elephant shrews (Elephantulus brachyrhynchus), the striped field mouse (Rhabdomys pumilio), and the Pygmy mouse (Mus minutoides).
The scent is chemically derived into two substances: 1-hexen-3-one and 3-hexaone. The first substance is used primarily to attract the pollinators. The latter is a strong repellant but when both substances are released, the net effect attracts the mammals.
Method of seed dispersal is through mammalian locomotion and fecal disposal. Lizards have also been observed to assist this flower in seed dispersal.

References

External links 
 http://www.biodiversityexplorer.org/plants/cytinaceae/cytinus_visseri.htm
 http://www.ispot.org.za/node/141116
 

Parasitic plants
Cytinaceae
Dioecious plants